Dale  is a village in the administrative district of Gmina Racławice, within Miechów County, Lesser Poland Voivodeship, in southern Poland.

References

Dale